Zanjanrud-e Pain Rural District is in Zanjanrud District of Zanjan County, Zanjan province, Iran. At the National Census of 2006, its population was 11,686 in 2,801 households. There were 10,302 inhabitants in 2,855 households at the following census of 2011. At the most recent census of 2016, the population of the rural district was 8,348 in 2,611 households. The largest of its 55 villages was Rajin, with 1,640 people.

References 

Zanjan County

Rural Districts of Zanjan Province

Populated places in Zanjan Province

Populated places in Zanjan County